Natalie Jean Prass (born March 15, 1986) is an American singer-songwriter from Virginia Beach, Virginia. Her self-titled debut album was released on January 27, 2015, through Spacebomb and Columbia Records.

Biography 
Natalie Prass was born in Cleveland, Ohio. She lived in Los Angeles for a short time before moving to Virginia Beach when she was around three or four years old. She began writing songs when she was in the first grade, and formed a band with Matthew E. White in the eighth grade. She attended Frank W Cox High School and The Governor's School for the Arts. After high school, she went to Berklee College of Music for a year before transferring to Middle Tennessee State University in 2006. There she enrolled in a songwriting program. She released an EP, Small & Sweet, in 2009 and a second EP, Sense of Transcendence, in 2011. After auditioning with a video demo recorded on her iPhone, she started her career as a keyboardist for Jenny Lewis’ touring band.

On January 27, 2015, Prass released her eponymous debut album on Spacebomb and Columbia Records. It was recognized as one of the Best New Albums by music review website Pitchfork. The album was produced by Matthew E. White and Trey Pollard at Spacebomb Records in Richmond, Virginia.

Natalie appeared on the British music television show, Later... with Jools Holland, Episode 324 airing on Palladia, April 17, 2015.

On October 23, 2015, Prass announced a new EP, Side by Side, set to be released on November 20. It features two live tracks from her self-titled LP and three live covers.

On February 26, 2018, Prass released the single, "Short Court Style". Her second album The Future and the Past was released on June 1, 2018. In July 2018, she was announced as one of the supporting acts on Kacey Musgraves' "Oh, What a World Tour".

Discography

Studio albums

EPs

Singles

As lead artist

As featured artist

Guest appearances

References

External links
 

American singer-songwriters
American rock songwriters
American rock singers
American folk singers
Living people
American women singer-songwriters
American women rock singers
1986 births
21st-century American singers
21st-century American women singers
Middle Tennessee State University alumni
Spacebomb Records artists